Robert H. Allison (July 25, 1893 – December 31, 1959) was an American politician and lawyer.

Allison was born in Maynard, Ohio. He lost an arm in a mining accident. Allison went to Blackburn College, Washington University in St. Louis, and Illinois State University. Allison received his bachelor's and law degrees from Illinois Wesleyan University. He lived with his wife and family in Pekin, Illinois and practiced law in Pekin. Allison served in the Illinois House of Representatives from 1935 to 1955 and was a Republican. He ran for the Republican nomination in 1954 and lost the primary election to Harold Velde. Allison died suddenly on December 31, 1959, while hunting in a duck blind near Lafayette, Louisiana.

Notes

External links

1893 births
1959 deaths
People from Belmont County, Ohio
People from Pekin, Illinois
Blackburn College (Illinois) alumni
Illinois State University alumni
Washington University in St. Louis alumni
Illinois Wesleyan University alumni
Illinois lawyers
Republican Party members of the Illinois House of Representatives